Motbeg-e Olya (also Romanized as Moţbeg-e ‘Olyá; also known as Modbag-e ‘Olyá, Modbeg-e ‘Olyā, Modīg-e Bālā, Motbag Olya, Motbak, Motbak-e ‘Olyā, Moţbek-e Chāseb, and Moţlebek-e Bālā) is a village in Abdoliyeh-ye Gharbi Rural District, in the Central District of Ramshir County, Khuzestan Province, Iran. At the 2006 census, its population was 47, in 7 families.

References 

Populated places in Ramshir County